Fornes is a municipality in the province of Granada, Spain. As of 2019, it had a population of 555 inhabitants.

References

External links 

Fornes